Hollow Man or The Hollow Man may refer to:

The Hollow Man (1935 novel), a locked room mystery novel by John Dickson Carr
The Hollow Man (1992 novel), a science fiction novel by the US writer Dan Simmons
The Hollow Man (2011 novel), a London-based crime thriller by Oliver Harris
Hollow Man, a 2000 science fiction film inspired by H. G. Wells' The Invisible Man
Hollow Man 2, the film's 2006 sequel, starring Christian Slater
"Hollow Man" (song), a 2008 single by American alternative rock band R.E.M.
"The Hollow Man", a 1994 single by Marillion from the album Brave

See also
The Hollow Men (disambiguation)